Eugenie Tatuava (born 18 September 1984) in the Cook Islands is a footballer who plays as a forward. He currently plays for Tupapa Maraerenga in the Cook Islands Round Cup and the Cook Islands national football team.

References

1984 births
Living people
Cook Islands international footballers
Association football forwards
Cook Island footballers